Gerig is a surname. Notable people with the surname include:

 Alois Gerig (born 1956), German farmer and politician
 Peter Gerig (born 1934), Swiss biathlete

See also
 Gehrig (surname)
 Geri (surname)
 Gerić